Igor Alexandre Lolo (born 22 July 1982) is an Ivorian former professional footballer who played as a defender.

Club career
Born in Adzopé, Ivory Coast, Lolo started his career with ASEC Mimosas where he was spotted by K.S.K. Beveren who gave him a contract to come and play in Belgium. He stayed there one season before leaving for FC Metalurh Donetsk. After one season in Donetsk, he chose to come back to Belgium and was signed by K.F.C. Germinal Beerschot. After two seasons with Beerschot, he went to KRC Genk. Lolo moved to FC Dnipro Dnipropetrovsk in September 2008 for €4 million, before signing a two-and-a-half-year deal with AS Monaco on 28 January 2009.

In the summer of 2013, Lolo signed a two-year contract with FC Rostov. Previously, he played for fellow Russian Premier League side Kuban Krasnodar, but had his contract with them terminated in April 2013.

In 2016, he joined Westerlo.

International career
Lolo received his first cap in the friendly match against Paraguay at Kirin Cup on 22 May 2008.

Career statistics

International
Source:

Honours

Club
ASEC Mimosas
 Côte d'Ivoire Premier Division: 2003
 Coupe de Côte d'Ivoire de football: 2003

Beveren
 Belgian Cup: 2003-2004 runners-up

AS Monaco
 Coupe de France: 2010 runners-up

Rostov
 Russian Cup: 2013–14

International
Ivory Coast
 Africa Cup of Nations: 2012 runners-up

References

External links
 

1982 births
Living people
People from Adzopé
Association football defenders
Ivorian footballers
ASEC Mimosas players
K.S.K. Beveren players
Beerschot A.C. players
K.R.C. Genk players
FC Dnipro players
FC Metalurh Donetsk players
AS Monaco FC players
FC Kuban Krasnodar players
FC Rostov players
Ligue 1 players
Belgian Pro League players
Russian Premier League players
Ukrainian Premier League players
Ivory Coast international footballers
Ivorian expatriate sportspeople in Belgium
Ivorian expatriate footballers
Expatriate footballers in Monaco
Expatriate footballers in Belgium
Expatriate footballers in Ukraine
Ivorian expatriate sportspeople in Ukraine
Expatriate footballers in Russia
2012 Africa Cup of Nations players
2013 Africa Cup of Nations players